The Cartoon Company was an Australian children's television morning cartoon, airing every Saturday on the Nine Network.

It first broadcast on 19 July 1986 and was hosted by Young Talent Time star's Bob Driessen and Karen Dunkerton, as well as Craig Campbell, Kathy Hopper (who had also presented the early Melbourne edition of The Bugs Bunny Show in the 1980s) and Michelle Marr from 1986 to 1989 and later Robyn Gorrell (only from 1989), Tony Johnston (from 1989 to 1991), Kristine Davis (only from 1990) and Nerida Leishman (only from 1991).

Synopsis

The series featured jokes, competitions, guest stars and cartoons

List of Cartoons
{|class="wikitable"
|-
| Rocky and Bullwinkle
|-
|Hero High 
|-
| Dinosaucers
|-
| Scooby-Doo
|-
| Garfield
|-
| The Mork & Mindy / Laverne & Shirley / Fonz Hour
|-
| Grimm's Fairy Tale Classics
|-
| The New Archies,
|-
| The Karate Kid
|-
| Mighty Mouse: The New Adventures
|-
| Magilla Gorilla
|-
| The Adventures of the Little Koala
|-
| Valley of the Dinosaurs
|-
| The New Adventures of Zorro
|-
| Yogi's Space Race
|-
| Help! It's The Hair Bear Bunch
|-
| Pandamonium
|-
| Heathcliff
|-
| Josie and the Pussycats in Outer Space
|-
| The Real Ghostbusters
|-
| Richie Rich
|-
| The New Archie and Sabrina Hour
|-
| C.O.P.S.
|-
| Teen Wolf
|-
| Superman'
|-
| Sherlock Hound, BraveStarr|-
| Slimer! And the Real Ghostbusters|-
| The Littles|-
| Heathcliff and Marmaduke|-
| The Lone Ranger|-
| The Super Mario Bros. Super Show! 
|-
| The Care Bears Movie|}

Spin off series

The series also had a spin-off series for younger children called The C Company presented by Tony Johnston, Kristine Davis and Nerida Leishman who were The Cartoon Company's final three hosts. 

It was first broadcast on 3 March 1990 and featured several cartoons such as Denver, the Last Dinosaur, the first three Dot movies and The Charlie Brown and Snoopy Show 

whilst live action shows including Woof!, Professor Poopsnaggle's Steam Zeppelin, The Curiosity Show, KTV, Hills End, C'mon Kids, Pugwall, The Girl from Tomorrow, Bush Beat, Goodsports and Elly & Jools'' plus live-action movies and specials including works from the Children's Film Foundation.

Both of these shows were axed on 23 November 1991 on the same day.

Nine Network original programming
Australian children's television series
Television programming blocks in Australia
1986 Australian television series debuts
1991 Australian television series endings